Uvas Falls is located in Uvas Canyon County Park, near Morgan Hill, California. Nearby falls include, Basin Falls, Black Rock Falls, Triple Falls, Upper Falls and Granuja Falls.

References 

 https://www.alltrails.com/explore/trail/us/california/uvas-canyon-short-waterfall-loop?mobileMap=false&ref=sidebar-static-map
 https://www.world-of-waterfalls.com/waterfalls/california-uvas-canyon-waterfalls/

External links 
 Waterfalls of California

Landforms of Santa Clara County, California
Waterfalls of California